Mexicana Universal Veracruz is a pageant in Veracruz, Mexico, that selects that state's representative for the national Mexicana Universal pageant.

The State Organization has produced one Nuestra Belleza Mundo México titleholder in 2012 with Marilyn Chagoya.

Mexicana Universal Veracruz is located at number 12 with a crown of Nuestra Belleza México.

Titleholders
Below are the names of the annual titleholders of Nuestra Belleza Veracruz 1994-2016, Mexicana Universal Veracruz 2017, and their final placements in the Mexicana Universal.

 Competed in Miss Universe.
 Competed in Miss World.
 Competed in Miss International.
 Competed in Miss Charm International.
 Competed in Miss Continente Americano.
 Competed in Reina Hispanoamericana.
 Competed in Miss Orb International.
 Competed in Nuestra Latinoamericana Universal.

Designated Contestants
As of 2000, isn't uncommon for some States to have more than one delegate competing simultaneously in the national pageant. The following Nuestra Belleza Veracruz contestants were invited to compete in Nuestra Belleza México. Some have placed higher than the actual State winners.

External links
Official Website

Nuestra Belleza México